Stefano Morrone (born 26 October 1978) is an Italian footballer who played as a midfielder.

Club career
In 1998, he was co-signed by Lazio and Empoli. In 1999, he joined Piacenza along with Flavio Roma and Stefano Di Fiordo to Piacenza as part of Simone Inzaghi's deal. That month Piacenza also signed Empoli team-mate Arturo Di Napoli.

In January 2001, he joined Venezia, re-joined Di Napoli. He was loaned back to Cosenza in January 2002.

Palermo
After Venezia's owner Maurizio Zamparini purchased Palermo, he joined the Sicily side along with team-mate: Daniel Andersson, Bilica, Igor Budan, Francesco Ciullo, Kewullay Conteh, Di Napoli, Valentino Lai, Filippo Maniero, Antonio Marasco, Francesco Modesto, Frank Ongfiang, Generoso Rossi, Mario Santana, Evans Soligo, Ighli Vannucchi and William Viali.

In summer 2003, he was loaned to Serie A side Chievo along with Mario Santana, with Eugenio Corini moved to opposite direction. On 1 July 2004, he returned to Palermo, which the team won Serie B and promoted to the Italian top division in June 2004.

Livorno
In July 2005, he was sold to Serie A side Livorno for €500,000.

Parma
In July 2007, Morrone was signed by Parma for €2.5 million.

In 2009–10 season, he was the starting central midfielder in 352 formation, or 433 formation. partnered mainly with Daniele Galloppa, Blerim Džemaili (until February), Francesco Valiani (since February as left midfielder) and Luis Jiménez (since February as attacking midfielder). He only played as substitute in round 5, suspended in round 19 and round 29. Since April, Morrone was rested due to injury. He was also the team captain. On 5 May, he was returned from training and played the match against Juventus on 9 May, which he was recovered in-time to replace Džemaili who suspended.

On 19 August 2013 Morrone was signed by U.S. Latina Calcio in a temporary deal.

On 14 July 2014 he was signed by A.C. Pisa 1909.

International career
Morrone was call-up to 2000 Summer Olympics as backup player as Simone Perrotta was injured. He also played at 2000 UEFA European Under-21 Football Championship qualification, substituted Roberto Baronio, Gianni Comandini, Cristiano Zanetti respectively. In the last group stage match against Belarus U21 in October 1999, Morrone was in the starting XI, partnered with Roberto Baronio, Gennaro Gattuso and Andrea Pirlo in midfield.

In August 2006, he received a call-up from new Italy coach Roberto Donadoni against Croatia, but did not play. That match Giulio Falcone, Christian Terlizzi, Gennaro Delvecchio, Massimo Gobbi, Angelo Palombo and Tommaso Rocchi also received their first call-up.

Coaching career
In 2015, he was named Allievi youth coach for the refounded Parma, then in Serie D and under the presidency of Nevio Scala. He was promoted as Primavera coach in 2016, and also served as caretaker for two games following the transition from Luigi Apolloni to Roberto D'Aversa.

He left Parma in the summer of 2017 to accept an offer from Sassuolo as a youth coach and later also managed the Primavera team. On 6 November 2019, Morrone was appointed assistant manager to Fabio Grosso at Brescia Calcio, whit whom he had been friends win for several years. However, after 3 games in charge and 0 points, the duo was fired on 2 December 2019.

Career statistics

Honours
Cosenza
Serie C1: 1998

References

External links
FIGC.it 
Profile at AIC.Football.it 

Italian footballers
Italy under-21 international footballers
Serie A players
Serie B players
Cosenza Calcio 1914 players
Empoli F.C. players
Piacenza Calcio 1919 players
Venezia F.C. players
Palermo F.C. players
A.C. ChievoVerona players
U.S. Livorno 1915 players
Parma Calcio 1913 players
Association football midfielders
Sportspeople from Cosenza
1978 births
Living people
Footballers from Calabria